This is a list of the case law of the Court of Justice of the European Union (CJEU) within the field of copyright and related rights.

PR = Request for a preliminary ruling (under Article 267 of the Treaty on the Functioning of the European Union)

FF = Action for failure to fulfil an obligation

DA = Direct action

Copyright law of the European Union
Court of Justice of the European Union
European Union case law